Anna Marie Gutierrez  is a former Filipina actress.

Career
Gutierrez was a fashion model before entering the show industry.  In 1979, she was recruited as one of the cast in the movie Dolphy's Angels. However, she achieved full stardom when she starred in Peque Gallaga's erotic movie Scorpio Nights (1985) with Orestes Ojeda and Daniel Fernando.

She was nominated and won Best Actress for Gawad Urian Award in the film Takaw Tukso (1986) and in PMPC Star Awards for Movies in Unfaithful Wife (1986) and Hubad na Pangarap (1987).

After her last movie in 1987, she migrated to New York and started her career in the medical field. She is currently living in Larchmont, New York with her American husband and their daughter.

Filmography

References

External links

Filipino film actresses
Year of birth missing
Place of birth missing
Filipino expatriates in the United States
Filipino female models